Kim André Hunstad (born 7 December 1984) is a Norwegian football defender who currently plays for Norwegian Premier League side Stabæk Fotball.

He played youth football for Tromsø IL, then senior football for Ishavsbyen FK and Tromsdalen UIL before joining Kjelsås. After many years here he attracted the interest of several Norwegian Premier League clubs. He joined Stabæk Fotball in the summer of 2012 and made his league debut for Stabæk as a substitute in the victory against Odd Grenland on 16 September 2012. He did not wish to renew the loan after the 2012 season.

References

1984 births
Living people
Sportspeople from Tromsø
Norwegian footballers
Tromsø IL players
Tromsdalen UIL players
Kjelsås Fotball players
Stabæk Fotball players
Eliteserien players
Association football defenders